Events in the year 2016 in Ecuador.

Incumbents
 President: Rafael Correa
 Vice President: Jorge Glas

Events
15 March – the 2016 Ecuadorian Army Arava crash (22 fatalities)
16 April – an earthquake with a moment magnitude of 7.8 struck Ecuador near the towns of Muisne and Pedernales, killing more than 650 people.

Sport
5-21 August – Ecuador at the 2016 Summer Olympics: 38 competitors in 13 sports

Deaths
1 March – Ítalo Estupiñán, footballer (b. 1952).

7 May – Gonzalo López Marañon, Roman Catholic bishop (b. 1933).

2 August – Álvaro Pérez Intriago, politician (b. 1936).

References

 
2010s in Ecuador
Years of the 21st century in Ecuador
Ecuador
Ecuador